Frank Russell (April 17, 1949 – September 6, 2021) was an American professional basketball player who played one season in the National Basketball Association (NBA) as a member of the Chicago Bulls during the 1972–73 season.

Biography
A shooting guard, Russell attended the University of Detroit Mercy where he was drafted by the Bulls in the third round of the 1972 NBA draft by the Bulls. His two brothers, Campy and Walker Russell also played in the NBA.

After basketball, Russell attended law school at Texas Southern University before returning to Michigan where he worked in his community for the rest of his active life.

Russell died of COVID-19 pneumonia in Pontiac, Michigan, on September 6, 2021, at the age of 72.

References

External links

1949 births
2021 deaths
American men's basketball players
Basketball players from Michigan
Chicago Bulls draft picks
Chicago Bulls players
Detroit Mercy Titans men's basketball players
Small forwards
Sportspeople from Pontiac, Michigan
Thurgood Marshall School of Law alumni
Deaths from the COVID-19 pandemic in Michigan